is the 29th single by Japanese entertainer Noriko Sakai. Written by Lala Miura and Kyōichi Usamoto, the single was released on October 9, 1996, by Victor Entertainment.

Background and release
"Kagami no Dress" was used as the opening theme of the NTV drama series Zoku Hoshi no Kinka, which also starred Sakai. The B-side, "Star Talk", is a duet with singer Kyōichi Usamoto.

"Kagami no Dress" peaked at No. 9 on Oricon's singles chart. It sold over 447,000 copies and was certified Platinum by the RIAJ, becoming the second biggest-selling single in her career.

Track listing
All music is arranged by Takayuki Hijikata.

Charts

Certification

References

External links
 
 
  

1996 singles
1996 songs
Japanese television drama theme songs
Victor Entertainment singles